Yunlong District is one of six districts of Xuzhou, Jiangsu province, China.

Administrative divisions
In the present, Yunlong District has 9 subdistricts.
9 subdistricts
 Pengcheng
 Qingnian
 Tianqiao 
 Zifang
 Huangshan
 Luotuoshan
 Daguozhuang
 Cuipingshan
 Pantang

References

www.xzqh.org 

County-level divisions of Jiangsu
Administrative divisions of Xuzhou